Helston, sometimes known as Helleston, was a parliamentary borough centred on the small town of Helston in Cornwall.

Using the block vote system of election, it returned two Members of Parliament (MPs) to the House of Commons of England until 1707, then to the House of Commons of Great Britain until 1800, and to the House of Commons of the United Kingdom until the 1832 general election.

The Reform Act 1832 reduced its representation to one member, elected by the first-past-the-post system. Under the Redistribution of Seats Act 1885, it was abolished with effect from the 1885 general election.

Members of Parliament

MPs before 1640
 Constituency created (1298)

MPs 1640–1832

MPs 1832–1885

Elections

Elections in the 1880s

Elections in the 1870s

Elections in the 1860s

 Caused by Brett's appointment as Solicitor General for England and Wales

 Caused by the 1865 election being declared void on petition, due to bribery. At the original count for the by-election, both candidates received 153 votes apiece, but Campbell was declared elected after the Returning officer (who was the father of his election agent) cast a vote for him, after consulting a legal textbook which suggested he could make the casting vote. A petition was lodged, and a committee decided the returning officer had no right to cast the vote and should have declared both candidates elected. However, on scrutiny one vote was taken from Campbell's total, leaving Brett elected alone. This election led to Parliament deciding that "according to the law and usage of Parliament, it is the duty of the sheriff or other returning officer in England, in the case of an equal number of votes being polled for two or more candidates at an election, to return all such candidates".

Elections in the 1850s

Elections in the 1840s

 Caused by West's resignation, by accepting the office of Steward of the Chiltern Hundreds, in order to contest a by-election at Lewes

Elections in the 1830s

 Caused by Pechell's appointment as a Lord of the Admiralty

Notes

References

Further reading
  The History of Parliament Trust, Helston, Borough from 1386 to 1868
 
D Brunton & D H Pennington, Members of the Long Parliament (London: George Allen & Unwin, 1954)
 
F W S Craig, "British Parliamentary Election Results 1832–1885" (2nd edition, Aldershot: Parliamentary Research Services, 1989)
 Maija Jansson (ed.), Proceedings in Parliament, 1614 (House of Commons) (Philadelphia: American Philosophical Society, 1988)
 J E Neale, The Elizabethan House of Commons (London: Jonathan Cape, 1949)
 

Constituencies of the Parliament of the United Kingdom established in 1298
Constituencies of the Parliament of the United Kingdom disestablished in 1885
Parliamentary constituencies in Cornwall (historic)
Helston